333 is the fifth studio album and tenth overall project by American singer Tinashe. It was released independently through her own label Tinashe Music on August 6, 2021. The project features collaborations with Jeremih, Kaytranada, Kaash Paige, Absolutely, Wax Motif, Buddy, Channel Tres, Christian Blue, and Tinashe's brothers Quiet Child and Kudzai. The album's deluxe edition, featuring four additional tracks, was released on March 3, 2022.

Title
The album’s title itself is an allusion to the angel number 333 associated with messages from the divine of protection, love, and destiny. Regarding the title selection, Tinashe commented that “I named it 333 because I really felt like I was on the right path, in alignment with what I was meant to do. I just wanted to acknowledge that.”

Promotion

Singles 
"Pasadena" featuring Buddy was released as the album's lead single on June 4, 2021. Its music video, directed by Micaiah Carter, was premiered on June 10, 2021, on Tinashe's YouTube account. The music video was created as a collaborative effort with photography mobile-app, VSCO, and was further promoted by the company through social media creative challenge which encouraged users to create and share contents inspired by the music video, using the hashtag #VSCOPasadena. The second single, "Bouncin", was released on July 9, 2021, and its music video was subsequently released on July 14, 2021, directed by Llyod Pursall. The album's promotional single, "I Can See the Future", was released on July 23, 2021, along with announcing the album track list. "Naturally" was released as the lead single from the album's deluxe edition (and fifth overall) on February 14, 2022. “HMU for a Good Time” is the sixth overall single and the second single from the deluxe version. The video was released as a surprise on June 24, 2022.

Tour 
To promote the album, Tinashe announced her 333 Tour, with Rei Ami as the supporting act. In less than one week after pre-sale and general tickets were made available, several dates were sold out, prompting new dates to be added. The concert tour will also be available to worldwide audience as a livestream concert event, in partnership with Moment House, which will be the "exclusive digital tour experience" and is promised to be "specially crafted for at-home fans around the world".

Scheduled tour dates

Critical reception 

333 received critical acclaim. At Metacritic, which assigns a normalised rating out of 100 to reviews from mainstream critics, the album has an average score of 84 based on five reviews, indicating "universal acclaim". Clash Music called the album a "a sparkling display of personal evolution" and despite not being a radically innovative record, it is coherent with "artful production", and "never having a dull moment". They also praised Tinashe's vocals as "faultless as ever" with "rap-like cadences." Giving four out of five stars, NME said 333 "furthers the 28-year-old's narrative of being whatever she wants to be musically". The album also "gives off the same energy as Tinashe's early mixtapes such as Black Water and In Case We Die, reminding us of the singular artist that [she] is and always has been." Pitchfork named 333 her best work to date, stating it as a "showcase for her omnivorous tastes and supremely light touch. Tinashe's voice glides through much of the record as if she's smirking at a private joke. Ultimately, it's that breezy, impish spirit that most distinguishes 333 and its predecessor from her RCA albums."

AllMusic claimed that "333 sees the singer truly settling into independence. There's a near surplus of the breathy slow jams and midtempo cuts that roll and skitter like the tracks on which she built her reputation. Each one of those songs uniquely tweaks the approach to make it sound fresh." Stereogum said Tinashe spends most of the album "sliding across an eclectic landscape of sounds, centered on fluttery impressionistic R&B but just as likely to veer into neon arena anthems (the Stargate-produced 'The Chase'), undulating synth-pop ('Undo (Back To My Heart)' with Wax Motif), breathless dance-adjacent hip-hop (the Buddy collab 'Pasadena'), or darkly spacious slow jams (the Kaash Paige duet 'Angels')." They also praised the cohesiveness of the album in comparison to her previous works "whereas the similarly diverse Joyride seemed awkwardly stitched together, a result of too many cooks in the kitchen, Tinashe's post-RCA albums feel coherent no matter how much she experiments because they're so clearly an outgrowth of her own perspective. She's the one calling the shots, and she knows damn well what she’s doing."

Year-end lists 2021

Year-end lists 2022

Track listing

Notes
"Unconditional" contains a hidden track called "I Dare You" starting at 1:11.

Charts

References

2021 albums
Tinashe albums